Pieter Maessins (Ghent, 1505; Benfeld 12 december 1562) was choirmaster of Notre Dame de Courtrai, and a composer at the Habsburg court of Ferdinand II and Maximilian II.

Selected works
Discessu
En venant de Lyon
In dedicatione huius templi

References

1562 deaths
1505 births